Arismendy Alcántara (born October 29, 1991) is a Dominican professional baseball center fielder and second baseman for the Hokkaido Nippon-Ham Fighters of Nippon Professional Baseball (NPB). Alcántara signed as an international free agent with the Chicago Cubs in 2008 as a shortstop. He previously played in Major League Baseball (MLB) for the Cubs, Oakland Athletics, and Cincinnati Reds.

Career

Chicago Cubs
Alcántara signed as an international free agent with the Chicago Cubs in 2008 as a shortstop. He made his professional debut in the Dominican Summer League that summer. He played for the Peoria Chiefs of the Class A Midwest League in 2011, and the Daytona Cubs of the Class A-Advanced Florida State League in 2012, batting .302/.339/.447 in 331 at bats. He was limited in the 2012 season by a broken foot.

In 2013, Alcántara played for the Tennessee Smokies of the Class AA Southern League. When the Cubs promoted fellow shortstop Javier Baez to Tennessee at midseason, they moved Alcántara to second base. Alcántara was selected to represent the Cubs at the 2013 All-Star Futures Game where he hit a home run. He also appeared in the Southern League All-Star Game. He batted .271/.352/.451 in 494 at bats, and was 2nd in the league in doubles (36), tied for 2nd in stolen bases (31), 3rd in intentional walks (6), 5th in RBIs (69), tied for 5th in sacrifices (9), 8th in runs (69) and walks (62), and tied for 9th in home runs (15). After the season, the Cubs added Alcántara to their 40-man roster.

Alcántara began the 2014 season with the Iowa Cubs of the Class AAA Pacific Coast League (PCL). With Iowa, he batted .307/.353/.537 in 335 at bats. The Cubs promoted him to the majors on July 9 to replace Darwin Barney, who was placed on the paternity list. Following a four-hit game on July 10, the Cubs informed him they would extend his time with the major league team through at least the All-Star break. Alcántara appeared in 70 games and finished 2014 with a .205 batting average, 10 home runs, and 29 RBIs.

Alcántara spent the majority of the 2015 campaign back with Iowa, slashing .231/.285/.399 in 499 AAA plate appearances. In 11 games with the big league club, he batted .077 (2-for-26).

Oakland Athletics
Alcántara began the 2016 season with Iowa, but was traded to the Oakland Athletics for Chris Coghlan on June 9. He was assigned to the Nashville Sounds of the PCL, and recalled by Oakland ten games later.

Cincinnati Reds

On October 6, 2016, Alcántara was claimed off waivers by the Cincinnati Reds. He elected free agency on November 6, 2017.

Mexican League (2018)
On April 8, 2018, Alcántara signed with the Diablos Rojos del México of the Mexican Baseball League. On May 4, 2018, Alcántara was traded to the Guerreros de Oaxaca of the Mexican Baseball League. He was released on August 14, 2018. On August 14, 2018, Alcántara signed with the Toros de Tijuana of the Mexican Baseball League.

New York Mets
On January 3, 2019, Alcántara signed a minor league deal with the New York Mets. He became a free agent following the 2019 season. With the AAA Syracuse Mets, he batted .294/.358/.508 in 303 at bats.

Los Angeles Angels
On December 10, 2019, Alcántara signed a minor league deal with the Los Angeles Angels that included an invitation to spring training. He became a free agent on November 2, 2020.

San Francisco Giants
On January 12, 2021, Alcántara signed a minor league contract with the San Francisco Giants organization. He became a free agent following the season.

Hokkaido Nippon-Ham Fighters
On December 10, 2021, Alcántara signed with the Hokkaido Nippon-Ham Fighters of Nippon Professional Baseball.

On April 24, 2022, Alcántara became the 20th player in NPB history to hit a home run from both sides of the plate in the same game.

References

External links

1991 births
Living people
Binghamton Rumble Ponies players
Boise Hawks players
Chicago Cubs players
Cincinnati Reds players
Daytona Cubs players
Diablos Rojos del México players
Dominican Republic expatriate baseball players in Mexico
Dominican Republic expatriate baseball players in the United States
Dominican Summer League Cubs players
Guerreros de Oaxaca players
Iowa Cubs players
Major League Baseball players from the Dominican Republic
Major League Baseball second basemen
Mexican League baseball outfielders
Mexican League baseball second basemen
Mexican League baseball shortstops
Nashville Sounds players
Navegantes del Magallanes players
Oakland Athletics players
Pensacola Blue Wahoos players
Peoria Chiefs players
Stockton Ports players
Syracuse Mets players
Tennessee Smokies players
Tigres del Licey players
Toros de Tijuana players
Hokkaido Nippon-Ham Fighters players
Dominican Republic expatriate baseball players in Venezuela
Dominican Republic expatriate baseball players in Japan
Sportspeople from Santo Domingo